In mathematics, specifically in algebraic geometry, the Grothendieck–Riemann–Roch theorem is a far-reaching result on coherent cohomology. It is a generalisation of the Hirzebruch–Riemann–Roch theorem, about complex manifolds, which is itself a generalisation of the classical Riemann–Roch theorem for line bundles on compact Riemann surfaces.

Riemann–Roch type theorems relate Euler characteristics of the cohomology of a vector bundle with their topological degrees, or more generally their characteristic classes in (co)homology or algebraic analogues thereof. The classical Riemann–Roch theorem does this for curves and line bundles, whereas the Hirzebruch–Riemann–Roch theorem generalises this to vector bundles over manifolds. The Grothendieck–Riemann–Roch theorem sets both theorems in a relative situation of a morphism between two manifolds (or more general schemes) and changes the theorem from a statement about a single bundle, to one applying to chain complexes of sheaves.

The theorem has been very influential, not least for the development of the Atiyah–Singer index theorem. Conversely, complex analytic analogues of the Grothendieck–Riemann–Roch theorem can be proved using the index theorem for families. Alexander Grothendieck gave a first proof in a 1957 manuscript, later published. Armand Borel and Jean-Pierre Serre wrote up and published Grothendieck's proof in 1958. Later, Grothendieck and his collaborators simplified and generalized the proof.

Formulation
Let X be a smooth quasi-projective scheme over a field. Under these assumptions, the Grothendieck group  of bounded complexes of coherent sheaves is canonically isomorphic to the Grothendieck group of bounded complexes of finite-rank vector bundles. Using this isomorphism, consider the Chern character (a rational combination of Chern classes) as a functorial transformation:

where  is the Chow group of cycles on X of dimension d modulo rational equivalence, tensored with the rational numbers. In case X is defined over the complex numbers, the latter group maps to the topological cohomology group:

Now consider a proper morphism  between smooth quasi-projective schemes and a bounded complex of sheaves  on 

The Grothendieck–Riemann–Roch theorem relates the pushforward map

(alternating sum of higher direct images) and the pushforward

by the formula

Here  is the Todd genus of (the tangent bundle of) X. Thus the theorem gives a precise measure for the lack of commutativity of taking the push forwards in the above senses and the Chern character and shows that the needed correction factors depend on X and Y only. In fact, since the Todd genus is functorial and multiplicative in exact sequences, we can rewrite the Grothendieck–Riemann–Roch formula as

For example, when f is a smooth morphism,  is simply a vector bundle, known as the tangent bundle along the fibers of f.

Generalising and specialising

Generalisations of the theorem can be made to the non-smooth case by considering an appropriate generalisation of the combination  and to the non-proper case by considering cohomology with compact support. 
 
The arithmetic Riemann–Roch theorem extends the Grothendieck–Riemann–Roch theorem to arithmetic schemes.

The Hirzebruch–Riemann–Roch theorem is (essentially) the special case where Y is a point and the field is the field of complex numbers.

A version of Riemann–Roch theorem for oriented cohomology theories was proven by Ivan Panin and Alexander Smirnov. It is concerned with multiplicative operations between algebraic oriented cohomology theories (such as algebraic cobordism). The Grothendieck-Riemann-Roch is a particular case of this result, and the Chern character comes up naturally in this setting.

Examples

Vector bundles on a curve 
A vector bundle  of rank  and degree  (defined as the degree of its determinant; or equivalently the degree of its first Chern class) on a smooth projective curve over a field  has a formula similar to Riemann–Roch for line bundles. If we take  and  a point, then the Grothendieck–Riemann–Roch formula can be read as

hence,

This formula also holds for coherent sheaves of rank  and degree .

Smooth proper maps 
One of the advantages of the Grothendieck–Riemann–Roch formula is it can be interpreted as a relative version of the Hirzebruch–Riemann–Roch formula. For example, a smooth morphism  has fibers which are all equi-dimensional (and isomorphic as topological spaces when base changing to ). This fact is useful in moduli-theory when considering a moduli space  parameterizing smooth proper spaces. For example, David Mumford used this formula to deduce relationships of the Chow ring on the moduli space of algebraic curves.

Moduli of curves 
For the moduli stack of genus  curves (and no marked points)  there is a universal curve  where  (is the moduli stack of curves of genus  and one marked point. Then, he defines the tautological classes

Note the fiber of over a point  this is the dualizing sheaf . Because  is a smooth Deligne–Mumford stack, he considered a covering by a scheme  which presents  for some finite group .

Because

this gives the formula

The computation of  can then be reduced even further. In even dimensions ,

Also, on dimension 1,

where  is a class on the boundary. In the case  and on the smooth locus  there are the relations

Closed embedding 
Closed embeddings  have a description using the Grothendieck–Riemann–Roch formula as well, showing another non-trivial case where the formula holds. For a smooth variety  of dimension  and a subvariety  of codimension , there is the formula

Using the short exact sequence

,

there is the formula

for the ideal sheaf since .

Applications

Quasi-projectivity of moduli spaces 
Grothendieck–Riemann–Roch can be used in proving that a coarse moduli space , such as the moduli space of pointed algebraic curves , admits an embedding into a projective space, hence is a quasi-projective variety. For instance,  has the family of curves

with sections

corresponding to the marked points. Since each fiber has the canonical bundle , there are the associated line bundles

and

It turns out that

is an ample line bundlepg 209, hence the coarse moduli space  is quasi-projective.

History 
Alexander Grothendieck's version of the Riemann–Roch theorem was originally conveyed in a letter to Jean-Pierre Serre around 1956–1957. It was made public at the initial Bonn Arbeitstagung, in 1957. Serre and Armand Borel subsequently organized a seminar at Princeton University to understand it. The final published paper was in effect the Borel–Serre exposition.

The significance of Grothendieck's approach rests on several points. First, Grothendieck changed the statement itself: the theorem was, at the time, understood to be a theorem about a variety, whereas Grothendieck saw it as a theorem about a morphism between varieties. By finding the right generalization, the proof became simpler while the conclusion became more general. In short, Grothendieck applied a strong categorical approach to a hard piece of analysis. Moreover, Grothendieck introduced K-groups, as discussed above, which paved the way for algebraic K-theory.

See also 
Kawasaki's Riemann–Roch formula

Notes

References

External links
 The Grothendieck-Riemann-Roch Theorem
The thread "Applications of Grothendieck-Riemann-Roch?" on MathOverflow.
 The thread "how does one understand GRR? (Grothendieck Riemann Roch)" on MathOverflow.
The thread "Chern class of ideal sheaf" on Stack Exchange.

Topological methods of algebraic geometry
Theorems in algebraic geometry
Bernhard Riemann